Enric Casals i Defilló (Barcelona, July 26, 1892 - July 31, 1986), brother of Pablo Casals, was a Spanish violinist, composer and conductor.

Biography 
He started to study music with his father, Carles Casals i Ribes. Then, he became a disciple of Rafael Gálvez. Afterwards, he went to Brussels in order to improve his violin and composition skills, with Mathieu Crickboom and Joseph Jongen; and in 1918 he moved to Prague, where he was a pupil of František Suchý. He established the String Quartet "Enric Casals" in 1921, with which he toured Europe, offering concerts in France, Belgium, England, Switzerland and Spain. He played as the solo violinist of the Barcelona Symphony Orchestra (1910 - 1912), the Kurot Symphonische Orchester in Saint Petersburg (1912 - 1914), the Pau Casals Orchester (1920 - 1936) and the one of the Gran Teatre del Liceu (1924 - 1935). He was sub-conductor of the Pau Casals Orchester (1920 - 1936), conductor of the Orquestra Ibèrica de Concerts (1940 - 1942) and the Orquestra Professional de Cambra de Barcelona, with which he conducted almost a hundred concerts. Besides he occasionally conducted other important orchestras around the world, such as the national orchestras of Portugal, Mexico, Hungary, Greece, and the Lamoureux Orchestra of Paris. He was founder and director of the Musical Institute Casals and responsible of the famous Prades Festivals (especially between 1955 and 1983).

Works 
 Violin Concerto
 Concerto for cello and orchestra
 Suite in D minor: Tribute to Pau Casals (1973), for cello

Sardanes 
 A en Juli Garreta (1924), with the melody of Els Segadors
 Angoixa (s/d), amb la melodia dEls Segadors
 Barcelona (1976)
 Catalunya avant (1910), with popular melodies (Rossinyol que vas a França)
 Cants de tardor
 Dramàtica, composed for orchestra
 Era una vegada (1935)
 Festa (1920)
 La font del Penedès (1954)
 Heroica (1919), dedicated to his brother Pablo
 Íntima (1920)
 Lleida a la Verge de Granyena (1976), for choir and cobla
 Lluny...! (1918), written in Montevideo
 La mainada de Sant Salvador (1928), with the melodies of Senyor Ramon and 'El General Bum-Bum
 Montserrat en primavera (1968), sardana upon request, with melodies of Montserrat
 Mònica
 La nena galana (1908)
 La platja de Sant Salvador, it's another title for the sardana La mainada de Sant Salvador
 Recordant Conrad Saló, a different title for the sardana Íntima
 Sardana de carrer (1927)
 La sardana dels Tres Reis (1983), for choir and cobla
 Setembre (1924)
 Tarragona (1927)
 Tres amors (1949)
 Trista (1925)
 El Vendrell (1948)

Instrumentations of compositions 
 Juny, of Juli Garreta, arranged for symphony orchestra

Instrumentations of compositions of Pablo Casals 
 El cant dels ocells, popular Catalan song harmonized by Pablo Casals
 Himne de les Nacions Unides
 El Pessebre, oratorio
 Sant Martí del Canigó, sardana

References

Further reading
 Pau Casals: dades biogràfiques inèdites, cartes íntimes i records viscuts, Enric Casals, Pòrtic, Barcelona (1979)
 Gran Enciclopèdia de la Música. Vol. 2, Jesús Giralt Radigales, Fundació Enciclopèdia Catalana, Barcelona (1999), 
 Diccionario de la Música Española e Hispanoamericana. Vol. 3, Emilio Casares Rodicio, (1999 - 2002),

External links 
 Índex de les sardanes d'Enric Casals
 Estrena de El Pessebre Acapulco, desembre de 1960  Foto. D'esquerra a dreta: dempeus, Enric Casals; asseguts, Pau Casals i Joan Alavedra; dempeus, Narcís Costa
 Foto Enric Casals 

People from Barcelona
Classical musicians from Catalonia
Composers from Catalonia
Spanish classical violinists
Male classical violinists
Spanish classical composers
Spanish male classical composers
20th-century classical composers
1892 births
1986 deaths
20th-century classical violinists
20th-century Spanish musicians
20th-century Spanish male musicians